This is a list of hills in Hangzhou, Zhejiang province, China. Some hills listed may be alternatively named or classified in either Chinese or English as "peaks" and/or "mountains".

Baoshi Hill (宝石山), location of Baochu Pagoda
Beigao Peak (北高峰)
Chessboard Hill (棋盘山)
Daci Hill (大慈山)
Dahua Hill (大华山)
Dingjia Hill (丁家山)
Five-old Peak (五老峰)
Flying Peak (飞来峰)
Geling Hill (葛岭山)
General Hill (将军山)
Hupao Back Hill (虎跑后山), location of Dreaming of the Tiger Spring
Jiuyao Hill (九曜山)
Jinjia Hill (金家山)
Jiangtai Hill (将台山)
Lion Hill (狮子山)
Lingfeng Hill (灵峰山)
Nangao Peak (南高峰)
Nanping Hill (南屏山), location of one of the Ten Scenes of West Lake, "Night Bell at Nanping Hill"
Phoenix Hill (凤凰山)
Qinglong Hill (青龙山)
Shouxintou (寿星头)
Trunk Peak (象鼻山)
Tianma Hill (天马山)
Wuyun Hill (五云山)
Yuegui Peak (月桂峰)
Yuhuang Hill (玉皇山)
Ziyang Hill (紫阳山)
Mount Huang (黄山）
Mantou Hill （馒头山）
Geography of Hangzhou
Hills of China